Hensenanthula is a genus of cnidarians belonging to the family Botrucnidiferidae.

The species of this genus are found in Atlantic Ocean.

Species:

Hensenanthula dactylifera 
Hensenanthula rotunda

References

Botrucnidiferidae
Anthozoa genera